Schoeniparus is a genus of passerine birds in the family Pellorneidae.

Taxonomy
The species in genus Schoeniparus were until recently placed in the genus Alcippe with other fulvettas. Recent genetic analysis found that genus polyphyletic and Schoeniparus was resurrected for a group of seven species.

The genus currently contains the following seven species:

References

Bird genera
Schoeniparus